Johan Støa is the name of:

Johan Støa (politician) (1913–1973), Norwegian politician
Johan Støa (sportsperson) (1900–1991), Norwegian competitor in multiple sports